Lutry Castle or Rôdeurs Castle is a medieval castle in the Swiss municipality of Lutry in the canton of Vaud.  It is a Swiss heritage site of national significance.

See also
 List of castles in Switzerland
 Château

References

External links

Castles in Vaud
Cultural property of national significance in the canton of Vaud